Sergei Viktorovich Sedyshev (born 25 January 1963) is a Russian professional football coach.

External links
  Career summary by FootballFacts

1963 births
Living people
Russian football managers